Harris Smith may refer to:

Plaxico Burress, NFL player who used this name as an alias
Harris Smith (filmmaker), filmmaker and essayist, co-founder of Remodernist film